Zodionini is a tribe of flies from the family Conopidae.

Genera
Zodion Latreille, 1796

References

Conopidae
Brachycera tribes
Taxa named by Pierre André Latreille